On 28 February 2012, approximately 12 militants who were dressed in military uniforms stopped multiple buses on their routes through the Kohistan District in Khyber Pakhtunkhwa, Pakistan. 18 passengers were subsequently taken out of the buses and executed by the militants; 17 of the 18 victims were identified as Shia Muslim residents of Gilgit–Baltistan who were travelling to the city of Gilgit from Rawalpindi, Punjab, while the remaining non-Shia victim was a Sunni Muslim who failed to convince the militants that he was not Shia. The victims were killed on the basis of their religious affiliation with the Shia sect of Islam after identification. Among the dead in the massacre were three children.

Responsibility for the attack was claimed by Jundallah, a locally banned terrorist organization associated with the Tehrik-i-Taliban Pakistan. The attack was followed by nationwide protests by the Pakistani Shia community, wherein they demanded that perpetrators be caught and security be provided to the Shia minority in the Sunni-majority country.

Background

Religious extremism is prevalent in Pakistan. Members of the Shia community have been targeted in a number of attacks against the shias in the country. There have been several Incidents of killing of Shia Muslims and bomb blasts in the Shia mosque in Pakistan.
The Sunni extremist groups commonly attack government and civilian targets in north-west Pakistan, along with others that they consider to be infidels. The Shias in Pakistan frequently complain that "the Pakistani state does little to stop the attacks and has even released from custody notorious militants accused of carrying them out."

Incident

The convoy of four buses were travelling from Rawalpindi, Punjab to Gilgit, Gilgit Baltistan. On an empty stretch of the Karakoram Highway (KKH), Kohistan, (an area with a high Sunni population), 10 to 12 gunmen in military uniform flagged the bus for stopping. After the bus halted, gunmen boarded and asked for the passenger's identity cards. After checking them, the gunmen dragged a group of Shia men including three children off the bus. They were made to stand in a line by the roadside. Their hands were tied to their back and then shot. After the shooting the gunmen resorted to aerial firing and moved to the nearby hilly areas.

Among those killed was also a Sunni Muslim named Nisar Ahmed, the bus driver. He was killed along with the others as the gunmen did not believe he was a Sunni Muslim. A police official who had interviewed survivors said that "Nisar was shot dead when he erred in answer regarding Fajr prayers".

Aftermath
The Federal Minister for Interior Rehman Malik told reporters that the perpetrators had been caught. However, mass protests erupted in Gilgit as locals demanded compensation of PR 5 million for relatives of each victim. An individual named Ahmad Marwat claiming to be the commander of the banned terrorist group Jundallah claimed responsibility for the act by contacting the media after the incident.

Protests
On 13 April 2012, hundreds of activists of Shia Ulema Council staged a protest demonstration against sectarian violence in the Pakistan and demanded the government to provide security to the Shia community. The protestors carried flags and banners and raised slogans against the government and the forces involved in terrorist activities, resulting in killing of dozens of Shias in Quetta and Gilgit-Baltistan. The leaders of SUC condemned the continued, targeted killings of Shias. They also blasted the government for its failure in maintaining law and order in Gilgit-Baltistan and called on it to take immediate action against those involved in the sectarian killings. The leaders claimed hundreds of people had died in Parachinar, Hangu, Quetta and Gilgit- Baltistan, and accused the authorities of watching silently the loss of Shia community.

On 14 April 2012 responding to a call by Islamia School of Kargil to express solidarity with the people of Gilgit-Baltistan, all shops and business establishments in the town remained closed and vehicles kept off the roads in Kargil in the state of Jammu and Kashmir, India. Indian media claimed that protesters raised slogans against the Pakistani Government and Nayib Imam Jumma of Islamia School Kargil, Hujattul Islam Sheikh Hussain Mukaddas appealed to the Indian government to intervene and help stop the killings in the region.

Reactions 
UN Secretary-General Ban Ki-moon "extended his heartfelt condolences to the families of the victims of the 'abhorrent attack,’ as well as to the government of Pakistan."

See also
 August 2012 Mansehra Shia massacre

Further reading
 Skardu Kargil road :Tear down the Berlin Wall of Asia – Engineer Manzoor Hussain Parwana

References 

21st-century mass murder in Pakistan
Massacres in 2012
Kohistan District, Pakistan
Shia–Sunni relations
Terrorist incidents in Pakistan in 2012
Massacres in Pakistan
Massacres of men
Ethnic cleansing in Pakistan
Massacres in Pakistan-administered Kashmir
History of Gilgit-Baltistan
Violence against men in Asia
Violence against Shia Muslims in Pakistan
Jundallah (Pakistan) attacks
2012 murders in Pakistan
Terrorist incidents on buses in Asia